Margareta Maria Josepha (Margriet) Hermans (born 1954) is a Belgian singer, former radio and TV talk show host, politician and a member of the Open VLD. She was elected as a member of the Belgian Senate in 2007.

In 1993 one low-selling celebrity comic was based on her life, drawn by Erik Vancoillie.

Notes

20th-century Belgian women singers
20th-century Belgian singers
Belgian women pop singers
Belgian radio presenters
Living people
1954 births
Open Vlaamse Liberalen en Democraten politicians
Members of the Senate (Belgium)
Dutch-language singers of Belgium
Flemish television presenters
21st-century Belgian women singers
21st-century Belgian singers
Belgian women radio presenters
Belgian women television presenters
Belgian television talk show hosts